Cacia vermiculata is a species of beetle in the family Cerambycidae. It was described by Heller in 1923. It is known from the Philippines.

Subspecies
 Cacia vermiculata mindanaonis Breuning, 1980
 Cacia vermiculata vermiculata Heller, 1923

References

Cacia (beetle)
Beetles described in 1923